Beishi District is a district of Baoding, Hebei, People's Republic of China. In May 2015, it was merged with Nanshi District to form the new Lianchi District.

Administrative Divisions
Subdistricts:
Hepingli Subdistrict, Wusi Road Subdistrict, Siguan Subdistrict, Zhonghua Road Subdistrict, Dongguan Subdistrict

Townships:
Hanzhuang Township, Dongjinzhuang Township, Bailou Township

References

County-level divisions of Hebei
Former districts of China
Lianchi District
History of Hebei
2015 disestablishments in China
States and territories disestablished in 2015